Lucas Basset (born 28 March 1991) is a French orienteering competitor.

References

External links

1991 births
Living people
French orienteers
Male orienteers
Foot orienteers
World Orienteering Championships medalists
Competitors at the 2017 World Games
Junior World Orienteering Championships medalists
21st-century French people